Romania competed at the 2019 Summer Universiade in Naples, Italy held from 3 to 14 July 2019. The country won one silver medal and three bronze medals.

Medal summary

Medal by sports

Medalists

References

External links 
 Official website

Nations at the 2019 Summer Universiade
Summer U
Romania at the Summer Universiade